The 1971–72 Iraq Central FA First Division was the 24th season of the Iraq Central FA League (the top division of football in Baghdad and its neighbouring cities from 1948 to 1973), and the first after the return to the old name of First Division. Aliyat Al-Shorta won the league title for the fourth time. Ali Kadhim won both the top scorer and best player awards.

League table

Results

Top goalscorers

References

External links 
 Iraqi Football Website

Iraq Central FA League seasons
Iraq
League